Leigh Grant Vial (28 February 1909 – 30 April 1943) was an Australian patrol officer and coastwatcher in Papua New Guinea during the Second World War. His calm, clear voice earned him the nickname "Man With the Golden Voice".

When war broke out with Japan in late 1941 Vial was an Assistant District Officer stationed in Rabaul.

While a patrol officer he became the first white person to climb Mount Wilhelm, the highest mountain in Papua New Guinea. Vial was killed in a plane crash in 1943, the year after he had been awarded the American Distinguished Service Cross for his "extraordinary heroism" in New Guinea. He is buried in Lae War Cemetery.

References

1909 births
1943 deaths
Military personnel from Melbourne
Australian explorers
Australian military personnel killed in World War II
Explorers of Papua New Guinea
Papua New Guinea in World War II
People from Camberwell, Victoria
Recipients of the Distinguished Service Cross (United States)
Royal Australian Air Force officers
Royal Australian Air Force personnel of World War II
Territory of Papua people
Victims of aviation accidents or incidents in Papua New Guinea
Victims of aviation accidents or incidents in 1943
Burials at Lae War Cemetery